An antiemetic is a drug that is effective against vomiting and nausea. Antiemetics are typically used to treat motion sickness and the side effects of opioid analgesics, general anaesthetics, and chemotherapy directed against cancer. They may be used for severe cases of gastroenteritis, especially if the patient is dehydrated.

Some antiemetics previously thought to cause birth defects appear safe for use by pregnant women in the treatment of morning sickness and the more serious hyperemesis gravidarum.



Types
 5-HT3 receptor antagonists block serotonin receptors in the central nervous system and gastrointestinal tract. As such, they can be used to treat post-operative and cytotoxic drug nausea & vomiting.  However, they can also cause constipation or diarrhea, dry mouth, and fatigue.
 Dolasetron (Anzemet) can be administered in tablet form or in an injection.
 Granisetron (Kytril, Sancuso) can be administered in tablet (Kytril), oral solution (Kytril), injection (Kytril), or in a single transdermal patch to the upper arm (SANCUSO).
 Ondansetron (Zofran) is administered in an oral tablet form, orally dissolving tablet form, orally dissolving film, sublingual, or in an IV/IM injection.
 Tropisetron (Setrovel, Navoban) can be administered in oral capsules or in injection form.
 Palonosetron (Aloxi) can be administered in an injection or in oral capsules.
 Dopamine antagonists act on the brainstem and are used to treat nausea and vomiting associated with cancer, radiation sickness, opioids, cytotoxic drugs and general anaesthetics.  Side effects include muscle spasms and restlessness.
 Amisulpride (Barhemsys), administered by intravenous injection.
 Domperidone (Motilium)
 Olanzapine (Zyprexa)
 Haloperidol (limited in usefulness by extra-pyramidal and sedative side-effects)
 Alizapride
 Prochlorperazine (Compazine, Stemzine, Buccastem, Stemetil, Phenotil)
 Chlorpromazine (Use limited by sedating properties)
 Metoclopramide
 NK1 receptor antagonist
 Aprepitant (Emend) is a commercially available NK1 receptor antagonist
 Casopitant is an investigational NK1 receptor antagonist
 Rolapitant (Varubi) another recently approved drug from this class
 Antihistamines (H1 histamine receptor antagonists) are effective in many conditions, including motion sickness, morning sickness in pregnancy, and to combat opioid nausea. H1 receptors in central areas include area postrema and vomiting center in the vestibular nucleus. Also, many of the antihistamines listed here also block muscarinic acetylcholine receptors.
 Cinnarizine (UK only)
 Cyclizine
 Diphenhydramine (Benadryl)
 Dimenhydrinate (Gravol, Dramamine)
 Doxylamine (Bonjesta, Unisom)
 Mirtazapine (Remeron) is an antidepressant that also has antiemetic effects it is also a potent histamine H1 receptor antagonist, Ki=1.6 nM.
 Meclizine (Bonine, Antivert)
 Promethazine (Pentazine, Phenergan, Promacot) can be administered via a rectal suppository, intravenous injection, oral tablet or oral suspension for adults and children over 2 years of age.
 Hydroxyzine (Vistaril)
 Cannabinoids are used in patients with cachexia, cytotoxic nausea, and vomiting, or who are unresponsive to other agents.  These may cause changes in perception, dizziness, and loss of coordination.
 Cannabis, also known as medical marijuana in the United States, is a Schedule I drug.
 Nabilone
 Dronabinol (Marinol/Syndros) is a Schedule II drug in the U.S.
 Some synthetic cannabinoids such as Nabilone (Cesamet) or the JWH series.
 Sativex is an oral spray containing THC and CBD.  It is currently legal in Canada and a few countries in Europe & the US as of June 25, 2018. 
 Benzodiazepines (GABA receptor agonists)
 Midazolam (Versed) is given at the onset of anesthesia and has been shown in recent trials to be as effective as ondansetron, but most effective when used in combination with ondansetron.
 Lorazepam (Ativan) is said to be very good as an adjunct treatment for nausea along with first line medications such as Compazine. 
 Anticholinergics
 Hyoscine (also known as scopolamine)
 Atropine
 Steroids
 Dexamethasone (Decadron) is given in low dose at the onset of a general anesthetic as an effective antiemetic. It is also used in chemotherapy as a single drug as well as with other antiemetics such as 5-HT3 receptor antagonists and NK1 receptor antagonist, but the specific mechanism of action is not fully understood.
 Other
 Trimethobenzamide is thought to work on the CTZ
 Ginger contains 5-HT3 antagonists gingerols, shogaols, and galanolactone. Preliminary clinical data suggests ginger may be effective for treatment of nausea and/or vomiting in a number of settings.
 Emetrol is also claimed to be an effective antiemetic.
 Propofol is given intravenously. It has been used in an acute care setting in hospital as a rescue therapy for emesis.
 Peppermint is claimed to help nausea or stomach pain when added into a tea or peppermint candies.
 Muscimol is purported to have antiemetic activity.
 Ajwain is purported to be antiemetic. It is a popular spice in India, Ethiopia and Eritrea.

See also
 Cancer and nausea
 Emetic – substances that induce nausea and vomiting

References